Samuel G. Plantz (1859–1924) was a Methodist minister and seventh president of Lawrence University.

He was born in Gloversville, New York on June 13, 1859, second child of James and Elsie Ann (Stoller) Plantz.  He was raised in Emerald Grove, Wisconsin. He attended Milton College, and received his Bachelor of Arts degree from Lawrence University in 1880.  He was a student at Berlin University, 1890-1.  He then went on to receive his Bachelor of Sacred Theology and Ph.D. degrees from the Theological School of Boston University in 1883.

Plantz became president of Lawrence University in 1894, and served until his death on November 14, 1924, in Sturgeon Bay.  During his tenure, the student body increased from 200 to 800 and the number of faculty from nine to 68.  Numerous campus buildings were also erected during his presidency, including the prominent Chapel.  Plantz Hall, built in 1961, is named for him.

External links 
Lawrence University
Portrait of Samuel G. Plantz

1859 births
1924 deaths
Plantz, Samuel
Plantz, Samuel
Milton College alumni
Plantz
American Methodist clergy
19th-century Methodist ministers
20th-century Methodist ministers
20th-century American clergy
19th-century American clergy